Canthigaster capistrata, known as the Macaronesian sharpnose-puffer, is a species of pufferfish in the family Tetraodontidae. It is native to the Eastern Atlantic, where it is known to occur near oceanic islands. The species reaches at least 13 cm (5.1 inches) in total length.

References 

Tetraodontidae
capistrata
Fish described in 1839